Rolf Tibblin (born 7 May 1937) is a Swedish former professional motocross racer. He competed in the Motocross World Championships from 1957 to 1967. Tibblin was a three-time motocross world champion known for his exceptional physical fitness.

Motorcycle racing career
Born in Stockholm, Sweden, Tibblin competed in the 1958 250cc European Motocross Championship (the predecessor of the 250cc Motocross World Championship) riding a Husqvarna motorcycle to finish the season ranked second in the final point standings to Jaromír Čížek. He returned the following year and won the 1959 250cc European Motocross Championship as a member of the Husqvarna factory racing team.

Tibblin moved up to the premier 500cc motocross world championship for the 1960 season where he claimed third place in the series' final standings behind his countrymen Bill Nilsson and Sten Lundin. In 1961 and 1962, he was a member of the victorious Swedish teams at the Motocross des Nations. He went on to capture the F.I.M. 500cc Motocross World Champion in 1962 and 1963. He finished second to Jeff Smith in the 1964 world championship, before switching to the ČZ team for the 1965 season. He finished third in the 1965 championship behind Jeff Smith and Paul Friedrichs. In the 1966 season, he came in second behind Friedrichs.

Tibblin also represented Sweden in the International Six Days Trial and raced in the 1972 Baja 1000 off-road race with Gunnar Nilsson, in which they won the motorcycle division. After retiring from professional competition, Tibblin ran the "Husqvarna International Training Center"; a motocross school in Carlsbad, California during the mid-1970s as the sport enjoyed a boom in popularity. In 2008, he was inducted into the A.M.A. Motorcycle Hall of Fame.

References 

Living people
1937 births
Sportspeople from Stockholm
Swedish motocross riders
Enduro riders